Mitchell is an unincorporated community and census-designated place (CDP) in Madison County, Illinois, United States. As of the 2020 census, its population was 1,217. It is part of the Metro East region of greater St. Louis.

Geography
It is bordered to the south and east by Pontoon Beach, to the northeast by Edwardsville, and to the northwest by the unincorporated community of Brooks. A few years ago, Mitchell tried to become an independent city, but that vote was never allowed because of court challenges from nearby communities.

The community sits on the Mississippi River floodplain, known in the region as American Bottom.

The lone school in the town is Mitchell Elementary School. Near town to the east is the Gateway Commercial Business Center, a place of trucking companies and more. Also located in Mitchell is the Luna Cafe, a historic landmark along old Route 66.

References

Census-designated places in Madison County, Illinois
Census-designated places in Illinois